Niphoropica albipennis is a species of beetle in the family Cerambycidae, and the only species in the genus Niphoropica. It was described by Breuning in 1947.

References

Apomecynini
Beetles described in 1947
Monotypic beetle genera